Time Marches On is the fourth studio album released by American country music artist Tracy Lawrence. The title track spent three weeks at Number One on the Billboard country charts in 1996, becoming Lawrence's biggest chart hit to date. "Is That a Tear", "If You Loved Me", and "Stars Over Texas" were also released from this album, and all were Top 5 hits as well.

Track listing

Personnel
As listed in liner notes.

Flip Anderson – piano, keyboards
Tom Baughman – steel guitar
Bruce Bouton – steel guitar, slide guitar
Mike Brown – acoustic guitar
Dennis Burnside – piano, Hammond organ
Larry Byrom – acoustic guitar
Mark Casstevens – acoustic guitar
Billy Cochran – fiddle
Butch Davis – electric guitar, slide guitar
Deryl Dodd – background vocals
Paul Franklin – steel guitar
Rob Hajacos – fiddle, "assorted hoedown tools"
Tracy Lawrence – acoustic guitar, lead vocals
Liana Manis – background vocals
Brent Mason – electric guitar, acoustic guitar
Vic Mastrianni – drums 
Terry McMillan – percussion
Dave Pomeroy – bass guitar
Brent Rowan – electric guitar, mandolin
John Wesley Ryles – background vocals
Hank Singer – fiddle
Milton Sledge – drums
Joe Spivey – fiddle
Leon Watson – bass guitar
Dennis Wilson – background vocals
Lonnie Wilson – drums, percussion
Glenn Worf – bass guitar

Charts

Weekly charts

Year-end charts

References

1996 albums
Atlantic Records albums
Tracy Lawrence albums